The Political Film Society Award for Peace is awarded annually by the Political Film Society Award to a film that deals with the struggle for peace in both fictional and non-fictional stories. The award has been made by the Society since 1987. The number of films nominated depends on the number of movies that qualify, and has been as low as one and as high as fourteen.

The first recipient was Platoon in 1987. The award, as with any other Political Film Society Award, can go to a mainstream, independent or  international film.  The Political Film Society looks at a broad selection of movies before it nominates them.

1980s
1987 Platoon
 Gardens of Stone
1988 Good Morning, Vietnam
 1969
1989' Casualties of War
 Do the Right Thing
 Fat Man and Little Boy

1990s
1990 Dances with Wolves
 Dreams Come True
1991 Boyz n the Hood
 JFK
1992 Grand Canyon
 The Last of the Mohicans
 Mr. Saturday Night
1993 Heaven and Earth
 In the Name of the Father
1994 The War
1995 Beyond Rangoon
Murder in the First
 Picture Bride
 The Scarlet Letter
1996 Michael Collins
1997 Seven Years in Tibet
1998 Savior
American History X
The Boxer
Men with Guns
Regeneration
Saving Private Ryan
The Thin Red Line
1999 Three Kings
Cabaret Balkan
Earth
Light It Up
One Man's Hero
West Beirut

2000s
2000 Thirteen Days
The Cell
Crime and Punishment in Suburbia
It All Starts Today
It's the Rage
Kippur
The Terrorist
Titanic Town
X-Men
2001 Lumumba
Atlantis: The Lost Empire
Divided We Fall
Journey to the Sun
2002 The Quiet American
Antwone Fisher
Das Experiment
K-19: The Widowmaker
The Sum of All Fears
Time of Favor
To End All Wars
We Were Soldiers
2003 Sandstorm
Beyond Borders
Cold Mountain
The Dancer Upstairs
X2: X-Men United
2004 Tae Guk Gi
Carandiru
Hotel Rwanda
A Very Long Engagement
2005 Munich
Before the Fall
Downfall
In My Country
Jarhead
Private
2006 Joyeux Noël
End of the Spear
Letters from Iwo Jima
2007 O Jerusalem
Black Friday
In the Valley of Elah
Pierrepoint
Redacted
September Dawn
The Situation
2008 Stop-Loss
Gran Torino
2009 The Hurt Locker
Avatar
Brothers
Fifty Dead Men Walking
Flame & Citron
Inglourious Basterds
A Woman in Berlin

2010s
2010 The Ghost Writer
Formosa Betrayed
Green Zone
John Rabe
2011 5 Days of War
Amigo
City of Life and Death
Elite Squad: The Enemy Within
The Flowers of War
Kinyarwanda
The Lady
Machine Gun Preacher
Of Gods and Men
2012 West of Thunder
War of the Buttons
2013
Zaytoun
2014 Diplomacy
Cesar Chavez
Giovanni's Island
The Railway Man
2015 Timbuktu
Beasts of No Nation
Tangerines
2016
Eye in the Sky
Land of Mine
Tanna
2019 Ashes in the Snow
15 Minutes of War
Jirga
Official Secrets

2020s
2021 Margrete: Queen of the North
The Courier
Gift of Fire
Hive
The Trial of the Chicago 7
2022  [All Quiet on the Western Front]]
Donbass

Sources

See also
Political Film Society Award for Democracy
Political Film Society Award for Exposé
Political Film Society Award for Human Rights

Political Film Society
Awards established in 1987